Ina Meschik (born 25 September 1990 in Sankt Veit an der Glan) is an Austrian alpine snowboarder. She represented her nation Austria in two editions of the Olympic Games (2010 and 2014), and eventually claimed a bronze medal in parallel giant slalom at the 2010 FIS Junior World Championships in Lake Wanaka, New Zealand and fourth-place finishes at the FIS World Cup series. Meschik is currently a member of ASKÖ Landskron Ski Club in Villach, under her personal coach Tom Weninger.

Meschik made her official debut, as a 19-year-old, at the 2010 Winter Olympics in Vancouver, where she finished sixth in the women's giant slalom, losing out to Germany's Anke Karstens in the classification final match by sixty-four hundredths of a second.

At the 2014 Winter Olympics in Sochi, Meschik qualified for two alpine snowboarding events (including the first ever women's parallel slalom) by achieving fourth-place finishes from the FIS World Cup series in Rogla, Slovenia, and in Carezza, Italy. In the women's giant slalom, Meschik improved her prior performance in Vancouver with a fourth-place finish, but narrowly missed the bronze medal by almost a full second behind host nation's Alena Zavarzina in their small final match. Three days later, in the inaugural women's slalom, Meschik did not match her stellar stint from the giant slalom, as she lost the quarterfinal match to Germany's Amelie Kober by a hundredth-second margin.

References

External links
NBC Olympics Profile
FIS Ski Profile

1990 births
Living people
Austrian female snowboarders
Olympic snowboarders of Austria
Snowboarders at the 2010 Winter Olympics
Snowboarders at the 2014 Winter Olympics
Snowboarders at the 2018 Winter Olympics
People from Sankt Veit an der Glan
Sportspeople from Carinthia (state)